The Voice of Holland (season 2) was the second season of the Dutch reality singing competition, created by media tycoon John de Mol and the first sophomore season ever of the show's format. It was aired from September 2011 to January 2012 on RTL4.

One of the important premises of the show is the quality of the singing talent. Four coaches, themselves popular performing artists, train the talents in their group and occasionally perform with them. Talents are selected in blind auditions, where the coaches cannot see, but only hear the auditioner.

Martijn Krabbé, who was hosting season one, remained as the host but was now joint by Wendy van Dijk, with whom he was already sharing the hosting duties on (Idols. Winston Gerschtanowitz was interviewing the contestants and their inmates backstage while Airen Tjon-A-Tsien was the V-Reporter (social media correspondent) on this edition.

Angela Groothuizen, Nick & Simon and Roel van Velzen returned as coaches for their second season. Jeroen van der Boom left the show, being replaced by popular Dutch pop-artist Marco Borsato who would eventually win the show with 19-year-old Iris Kroes on the 20th of January 2012 over Chris Hordijk for Team Nick & Simon, who again became the runners-up of the show. Kroes won over Hordijk with only 51% of the votes, making her the second female contestant worldwide to win the show after Steliyana Khristova, who won the Bulgarian version of the show.

Summary of competitors
Competitors' table
 – Winner
 – Runner-up
 – Third
 – Fourth
 – Eliminated after semi-finals
 – Eliminated after quarter finals
 – Eliminated in earlier live shows
 – Eliminated in Sing-Off
 – Eliminated in The Battle

The Blind Auditions

Episode 1

Episode 2

Episode 3

Episode 4

Episode 5

Episode 6

Wildcard

The Battle

Advisors 

 – Battle Winner
 - Battle Loser

The Sing Off

Live shows

Liveshow 1 
Competition performances

Non-competition performances

Liveshow 2 
Competition performances

Non-competition performances

Liveshow 3 
Competition performances

Non-competition performances

Liveshow 4 
Competition performances

Non-competition performances

Quarter finals 
Competition performances

Non-competition performances

Semifinals 
Competition performances

Non-competition performances

Results show 

At the end of the show, all finalists sang their single.

Finals 
Competition performances

Results show

Celebrity performances

Ratings

The voice of Holland - Episodes

The voice of Holland - Real Life

See also
 The Voice (TV series)

References

External links
 The Voice of Holland Official website

Season 02
2011 Dutch television seasons
2012 Dutch television seasons